Constance Ford (born Cornelia M. Ford; July 1, 1923 – February 26, 1993) was an American actress and model. She is best known for her long-running role as Ada Lucas Hobson on the daytime soap opera Another World, which she played from 1967 until shortly before her death in 1993. She is also well-known for appearing in nearly two dozen movies from 1956 to 1974, with her most noteworthy role being the matriarch Helen Jorgenson in A Summer Place (1959).

Early years
Constance Ford was born Cornelia M. Ford on July 1, 1923, in The Bronx, to parents Cornelia R. (née Smith) and Edwin J. Ford. Her siblings were Arthur, John, and Evelyn. Ford was a graduate of St. Barnabas Grammar and High School, and she attended Hunter College. She studied acting at HB Studio in New York City.

Career
Ford initially worked as a model for the Montgomery Ward catalog when she was 15 years old. Her face became famous in the Elizabeth Arden 1941 advertising campaign for Victory Red lipstick, which featured a Philippe Halsman photo showing her face against the American flag.  She acted on Broadway from 1949, appearing in such productions as the musical Say Darling and Nobody Loves an Albatross. She also played the prostitute in the first production of Death of a Salesman.

She began her television career in 1950, with performances on live television dramas such as Studio One, Armstrong Circle Theatre, Goodyear Television Playhouse, and other acclaimed series. As a Warner Bros. contract player, she had her most famous role as Sandra Dee's heartless mother in A Summer Place (1959), in which her abused husband Richard Egan had a memorable scene telling her off for her outdated prejudices, and Ford arranges for Dee to be tested for her virginity. Another shocking scene had Ford slapping Dee so hard that she fell into a Christmas tree, which toppled over on her. In Rome Adventure (1962), she played Daisy Bronson, owner of a bookstore in Rome, opposite Suzanne Pleshette and Troy Donahue, being kinder to him than she had been in A Summer Place.  In House of Women, she played an aggressive but ultimately sympathetic female prisoner who gets into a catfight with prison matron Jeanne Cooper. She played the tough-as-nails nurse alongside Joan Crawford in The Caretakers (1963).  She also had a memorable walk-on playing a flirtatious but bored society matron who makes a play for Warren Beatty in All Fall Down.

She made three memorable appearances on Perry Mason, including the role of a woman with split personality in the 1958 episode "The Case of the Deadly Double", and as Frances Walden in "The Case of the Potted Planter" (1963) and defendant Sylvia Thompson in "The Case of the Shifty Shoebox" (also 1963). In 1960, she played heartless Connie Walworth ("You haven't got the flair, dear ...") for director Mitchell Leisen in the "Worse Than Murder" episode of Thriller. She was often featured in episodes of Kraft Television Theater, Appointment with Adventure, State Trooper, Dick Powell's Zane Grey Theatre (as Laura Lovett, opposite Jack Palance in the 1956 episode, "Lariat"), Bat Masterson, The Phil Silvers Show, Have Gun – Will Travel, Rawhide, Wanted: Dead or Alive, Tombstone Territory (episode "Silver Killers"), Gunsmoke (in the episode "Wagon Girls" and as title character in the episode "Poor Pearl" in 1956), Alfred Hitchcock Presents, Target: The Corruptors!, and The Twilight Zone episode "Uncle Simon". She also appeared on the NBC interview program Here's Hollywood. One of her Perry Mason episodes is on display as part of the introduction for jurors who serve in New York's criminal courts.

In 1954, she made her soap-opera debut as Lynn Sherwood on Woman With A Past on CBS. On Search for Tomorrow, Ford was Rose Peterson, an employee of the mob, who was hired to discredit leading character Joanne Tate. Her on-screen brother was played by Don Knotts. On The Edge of Night, Ford played the murderous theatre owner Eve Morris.

Another World 
In 1967, she joined Another World as Ada, the strong-willed mother of Rachel (Robin Strasser and later Victoria Wyndham). While her mother character was a total contrast to her role of Helen in A Summer Place, she was brutally tough and honest, yet supportive and loving, first as a working-class mother to Rachel and later as a mentor to many of Bay City's young characters. Her first line, responding to brother Sam Lucas's inquiry, "Ada, is that you?" was a curt, "No, it's Princess Grace!" 

Over the years, Ford played Ada's trials - she was widowed three times and worked in a variety of professions, from hairdressing to police clerk to restaurant owner.  In 1975, middle-aged Ada gave birth to a daughter, Nancy.  

Ford left the show in 1992 due to declining health, and Ada was said to be out of town visiting Nancy. When Ford died, the character of Ada also died, and the show paid tribute to character and actress both.

Recognition
The National Academy of Television Arts and Sciences gave Ford a Certificate of Merit for Outstanding Contribution to Daytime Drama.

Death
Ford never publicly dated, married, or had children, which fueled rumors that she was a lesbian. Ford was romantically linked to children's author Louise Fitzhugh in a biography of the latter, published in 2020.

Ford died in New York Hospital in Manhattan on February 26, 1993, from cancer, aged 69.

Filmography and selected TV work

References

External links

Her 1941 advertising image at Halsman retrospective at The Smithsonian NPG

1923 births
1993 deaths
20th-century American actresses
20th-century American LGBT people
Actresses from New York City
Female models from New York (state)
American film actresses
American television actresses
American soap opera actresses
Deaths from cancer in New York (state)
People from the Bronx